Mamaylı (also, Mamayly) is a village and municipality in the Qabala Rayon of Azerbaijan.  It has a population of 870.  The municipality consists of the villages of Mamaylı and Ovcullu.

References 

Populated places in Qabala District